The 1978 Amstel Gold Race was the 13th edition of the annual road bicycle race "Amstel Gold Race", held on Sunday March 25, 1978, in the Dutch province of Limburg. The race stretched 230 kilometres, with the start in Heerlen and the finish in Meerssen. There were a total of 138 competitors, and 32 cyclists finished the race.

Result

Amstel Gold Race
1978 in road cycling
1978 in Dutch sport
March 1978 sports events in Europe
1978 Super Prestige Pernod